The 1st Brigade (1 BDE) is a brigade of the Irish Army. The brigade, which was known as 1st (Southern) Brigade until the 2012 reorganisation of the army, has its headquarters in Collins Barracks in Cork.  The 1st Brigade is responsible for military operations in the south of Ireland. Its area of responsibility includes the counties of Galway, Offaly, Laois, Carlow, Kilkenny, Wexford, Waterford, Cork, Kerry, Limerick and Tipperary.

It is also responsible for the security of a number of "vital installations" including civil transport infrastructure sites such as Cork Harbour, Cork Airport, Shannon Airport and Farranfore Airport.

Units 
 Brigade HQ - Collins Barracks, Cork
 1st Infantry Battalion (Galway)
 3rd Infantry Battalion (Kilkenny)
 12th Infantry Battalion (Limerick)
 1st Artillery Regiment (Cork)
 1st Cavalry Squadron (Cork)
 1st Communication and Information Services Company (Cork)
 1st Engineer Group (Cork)
 1st Supply & Transport Group (Cork)
 1st Ordnance Group (Cork)
 1st Military Police Company (Cork)
 Army No. 2 Band

Barracks 
 Collins Barracks, Cork
 Sarsfield Barracks, Limerick
 Stephens Barracks, Kilkenny
 Dún Uí Mhaoilíosa, Galway

Training facilities 
 Lynch Camp, Kilworth
 Bere Island, Cork
 Fort Davis, Cork
 Carnagh Camp, Athlone

References

Military units and formations of the Irish Army